For the 1974 Vuelta a España, the field consisted of 88 riders; 55 finished the race.

By rider

By nationality

References

1974 Vuelta a España
1974